Shotton Colliery is a village in County Durham, England, situated north west of Peterlee.

The two villages in the parish of Shotton are Old Shotton, a small village southeast of the main village, now merged into the town of Peterlee.

History
Old Shotton can be traced back as far as 900 AD, when it was known as Scitton, which in Old English means 'of the Scots', The village name was first recorded in 1165 as 'Sottun'. By the 16th century, when Easington was under the control of Prince Bishops, the village had become known as Shotton.

In 1756, the Brandlings built Shotton Hall and through marriage this eventually passed to the Burdon family.

The Colliery
In 1833,  the Haswell Coal Company began to sink a colliery to the west of Old Shotton, near Shotton Grange Farm. This pit began producing coal the following year and the village of Shotton Colliery soon started to develop.

The pit was initially prosperous, but closed on 3 November 3 1877, causing people to leave the village to work at other pits in the area. In 1900, the pit reopened and grew rapidly, leading to an increased population in the village. More housing was built, making other industries, including the Coke Works and the Brick Works, less popular.

By 1947, the original houses, east of the railway line were in disrepair. Most of the bottom of Front Street was demolished.

In 1972, the National Coal Board announced that it was closing the colliery, at a cost of 800 jobs. Easington District Council built new housing in the 1970s, pulling down most of the remaining pit houses in an attempt to improve the village. Throughout most of the 1970s, work was done to remove the pit heap, which was at one time the largest in the country. The Brick Works and Coke Works went with the pit.

The only pit building left is now used as a second hand car show room. The remains of the pit baths remain semi-derelict.

Present-day
Shotton Airfield/Peterlee Parachute Centre now occupies the colliery site and it is common to see parachutists over the village most days.  

Most of the parish's pubs, cinemas and the railway station are demolished or converted to other uses. A small number of shops are left.

The village is now almost empty of work. There are a few industrial units close to the airfield and on the opposite side of the village at Thornley Crossings, but the main sources of employment are call centres which opened east of the village, dividing Shotton Colliery and Old Shotton.

Some of the buildings at Grange Farm remain and now overlook fields as they did in the 1840s, some of which contain the hard runway and hangars and other buildings of the parachute centre.

Notable residents 
 Bill Cockburn (19371995), footballer with Burnley F.C. and Gillingham F.C., was born in Shotton Colliery
 Maurice Cullen (19372001), boxer, lived in Shotton Colliery.
 Rebecca Posner (19292018), Professor of Romance Languages at the University of Oxford, was born in Shotton Colliery

References

External links
 
 

Villages in County Durham
Peterlee